Mel Lewinter is an American music industry executive. He is Executive Vice President of Label Strategy at Sony Music Entertainment.

Career

Lewinter has held several important positions within the music industry, working at Warner Music Group, Universal Music Group and now Sony Music Entertainment. He served as Vice Chairman of the Atlantic Group. Lewinter also served in high ranking positions at Warner Music Group. He was Executive Vice President of their US division and also served as the Chief Operating Officer of Warner Music Group.

Lewinter was also Vice Chairman of MCA Music Entertainment Group. More recently he served as Chairman & CEO of Universal Motown and then became Chairman & CEO of Universal Motown Republic Group.

He is the Executive Vice President of Label Strategy at Sony Music Entertainment. Doug Morris announced that he had appointed to this position in October 2011.

References

American music industry executives
Sony Music
Living people
Year of birth missing (living people)